Fish Lake is a lake in Chisago County, Minnesota, in the United States.

"Fish Lake" is an English translation of the native Ojibwe language name.

See also
List of lakes in Minnesota

References

Lakes of Minnesota
Lakes of Chisago County, Minnesota